is a term from Japanese martial arts and which relates to 'whole body movement', or repositioning. It can be translated as body-management. It is a term used widely in and very important in kendo, jujutsu, aikido, judo, karate and ninjutsu. Tai sabaki is usually used to avoid an attack, such that the receiver of the attack ends up in an advantageous position and it is often wrongly referred to as evasion.

An example of tai sabaki is 'moving off the line' of attack using irimi and tenkan movements rather than to 'move against' the attack. This implies the use of harmony rather than physical strength. See hard and soft (martial arts)

Tai sabaki is related to ashi sabaki (footwork) and te sabaki (handwork).

The origins of Tai-sabaki can be transliterated from the sumo wrestler way of honoring the top ranks of grand champions "津名学士気"; which translates into "Bachelor Flow of Grand Champions" when taking into account the yokozuna ranking system for sumo wrestlers.

Kata

Tai sabaki is also the name of a group of kata created by Yasuhiro Konishi under the tutelage of Ueshiba Morihei, the creator of aikido. These kata were named Tai sabaki Shodan, Tai sabaki Nidan and  Tai sabaki Sandan and are some of the original kata of Shindo Jinen-ryu style of karate, created by Yasuhiro Konishi.

All three katas were created on the basis of the Tai sabaki movements and the circular motions of aikido. 
Although they do not contain complex movements, the whole kata is to be performed as a chain of movements without a specific pause.

References

External links
 How to Do Tai Sabaki
 Introduction to Tai sabaki 
 Throwing Technique Structural Analysis (judo) 
 Tai sabaki Dojo in Valencia - Spain 
 (What is Sabaki - Ashihara Karate)

Stances
Japanese martial arts terminology